Ferrari GT 3: World Track is a 2012 racing video game developed and published by Gameloft for mobile phones. It is the third game in the Ferrari GT series.

Gameplay
Ferrari GT 3: World Track gives players the opportunity buy and drive 57 Ferrari models, including the 250 Testa Rossa, the Ferrari FF and the SA Aperta. Stages consist of races which take place around the world and include Sydney, Hong Kong, and the Ferrari Fiorano Test Circuit. Like other games in the series, the player can race in career mode, where they gain fame and earn money to then buy more cars and improve existing cars or in a quick race mode. The game also features information from the Ferrari Encyclopedia as player tips.

Reception

References

2012 video games
Racing video games
Ferrari video games
Gameloft games
Android (operating system) games
BlackBerry games
Java platform games
Mobile games
Symbian games
Video games set in Australia
Video games set in California
Video games set in China
Video games set in Dubai
Video games set in Florida
Video games set in France
Video games set in Hong Kong
Video games set in Italy
Video games set in Japan
Video games set in Los Angeles
Video games set in Miami
Video games set in Monaco
Video games set in Moscow
Video games set in Paris
Video games set in Russia
Video games set in Sydney
Video games set in Tokyo
Video games set in the United Arab Emirates
Video games set in the United States
Video games with 2.5D graphics
J2ME games